Alpochori, is a village and a community in the municipal unit of Iardanos, Elis, Greece. Alpochori is situated on a low hill, 3 km west of Vounargo, 9 km northwest of Pyrgos and 7 km southeast of Amaliada. The Greek National Road 9 (Patras - Pyrgos) passes west of the village.

Population

Community 
The community of Alpochori consists of three villages: Alpochóri (Αλποχώρι, 216 inhabitants in 2011), Kapandríti (Καπανδρίτι, 35 inhabitants in 2011) and Chanákia (Χανάκια, 469 inhabitants in 2011).

Sports

In 1978, the football (soccer) club Aetos Alpochori was founded, it presently plays in the second division of the local championship.  The team plays in its field that is named Tsaouseio and is named after Dionysios Tsaousis, who donated the field to the community.

See also

List of settlements in Elis

External links
Alpochori at the GTP Travel Pages

References

Iardanos
Populated places in Elis